Aiden Butterworth (born 7 November 1961) is an English former professional footballer who played for Leeds United and Doncaster Rovers. He was educated at Tadcaster Grammar School.

References
Profile at leeds-fans.org.uk

1961 births
Living people
English footballers
Leeds United F.C. players
Doncaster Rovers F.C. players
Association football forwards